Xhelal Pasha Zogolli was hereditary governor of Mati, father of Xhemal Pasha Zogu and grandfather of King Zog I.

Life
Xhelal Pasha Zogolli was educated privately. He served in the Montenegrin War of 1852-53. Later he visited Russia and inspired by Russians he attempted a local rebellion against Ottoman rule after his return which was unsuccessful because of the low participation. He married Ruqiya Khanum [Ruhijé Hanem], from the wealthy Alltuni family of Kavajë. He died apparently poisoned by Ottoman agents at Vienna, Austria, even though this claim is not yet proven. He was buried in Haji Badem Uskanda, Istanbul, Turkey.

Bibliography
 Patrice Najbor, Histoire de l'Albanie et de sa maison royale (5 volumes), JePublie, Paris, 2008,.
 Patrice Najbor, La dynastye des Zogu, Textes & Prétextes, Paris, 2002

External links 
Maison royale d'Albanie, site officiel en langue française
Famille royale d'Albanie, site officiel en langue anglaise

Albanian Pashas
Xhelal
Deaths by poisoning
19th-century births
19th-century deaths
People from Scutari vilayet

year of birth missing
year of death missing